Raumnes is a local newspaper published in Årnes, Norway. It covers the municipality of Nes i Akershus.

History and profile
Raumnes was established in 1947, and has been independent throughout its existence. It was originally published twice a week, but this has been increased to three. It had a circulation of 3,222 in 1983, increasing to 5,247 as of 2016. It is owned by various local people and groups.

References

External links
 Official website

1947 establishments in Norway
Publications established in 1947
Norwegian-language newspapers
Newspapers published in Norway
Mass media in Akershus
Nes, Akershus